Poličná is a municipality and village in Vsetín District in the Zlín Region of the Czech Republic. It has about 1,700 inhabitants.

History
The first written mention of Poličná is from 1310. It was probably founded around 1270.

Poličná was joined to the town of Valašské Meziříčí in 1976, until a vote to separate the town was held on 21 April 2012, in which the majority voted in favor. On 1 January 2013, Poličná officially became independent again.

References

Villages in Vsetín District